Saint-Rambert-en-Bugey station (French: Gare de Saint-Rambert-en-Bugey) is a railway station serving the town of Saint-Rambert-en-Bugey, in the Ain department in eastern France. It is situated on the Lyon–Geneva railway and served by TER Auvergne-Rhône-Alpes trains.

The station is located at the kilometric point (KP) 62.677 of the Lyon–Geneva railway, between Ambérieu and Tenay - Hauteville stations. It was brought into operation by the Compagnie du chemin de fer de Lyon à Genève on 7 May 1857. It is now owned by the SNCF.

The station has a bicycle parking area and a car park.

See also 

 List of SNCF stations in Auvergne-Rhône-Alpes

References 

Railway stations in Ain
Railway stations in France opened in 1857

Lyon–Geneva railway